Rantas is a mythical creature from Kashmiri folklore - a female with long hair, pointed teeth, long nails, and inverted feet who ventures out during heavily snowy nights. She is invoked to frighten children into staying safely at home during winter.

Rantas is said to abduct men, keeping them prisoner and later marrying them, due to sorrow over the loss of her lover. In stories, she wanders and wails on moonless nights, walking on feet which are turned backward. She only ventures out during heavily snowing nights and kidnaps young men who she gets infatuated with.

A famous story of Love-Lone and Rantas is quite popular in Kashmir urban legend which usually revolves around a man named Love Lone who was kidnapped by the creature Rantas disguised as a beautiful woman in the Nallah Ferozpora which some people doubt in the plot-location. Some sources however argue the story originated in the forests of Anantnag (Islamabad) while some others differ the location.

In January 2021, a clip was broadcast by a local news channel which had the audio of a female screaming and which were rumoured to be of a Rantas.

See also
 Chillai Kalan
 Bramrachokh
 Pasik dar

References 

Kashmiri culture
South Asian legendary creatures
Female legendary creatures
Bogeymen